The Old Appomattox Court House is a former county court house within the Appomattox Court House National Historical Park. In the 1800s this structure gave the surrounding village the name Appomattox Court House. The 1865 surrender of the Army of Northern Virginia on April 9 at the nearby McLean House by General Robert E. Lee to General Ulysses S. Grant commenced the conclusion of the American Civil War that finalized with the surrender of the Shenandoah on November 6, 1865.

The court house was registered in the National Park Service's database of Official Structures on June 26, 1989.  It is located on Virginia State Route 24, three miles (5 km) northeast of the town of Appomattox in Appomattox County, Virginia, where the "new" Appomattox Court House is located.

History
The original old Appomattox Court House was the first county seat of Appomattox County, Virginia. It was built in 1846, one year after Appomattox County was established, at what was known then as Clover Hill, Virginia. It was the second government public structure built after Appomattox County was formed. It was in the center of the village on a large green lot surrounded by the Richmond-Lynchburg stage road. The first building constructed after the county became official was the original wooden county jail built in 1845. The original courthouse was built across the street from the Clover Hill Tavern in 1846. This original courthouse building burned down in 1892. A second courthouse was constructed in 1892, which is near the location of the Appomattox Station in the town of Appomattox, Virginia.

The reconstructed old Appomattox Court House is now the visitor center for the Appomattox Court House National Historical Park. On the first floor is the information desk. On the second floor is a museum and the auditorium. An interpretive video presents the events of General Lee's Confederate Army of Northern Virginia's surrender to Lieutenant General Grant. Civil War weapons are on display, as are many photographs relating to the event. The old Appomattox Court House was reconstructed in 1963 and 1964 as the park's visitor center and information desk for the National Park Service.

Historical significance

The original county court house played no role in the surrender of General Robert E. Lee to General Ulysses S. Grant, as it was Palm Sunday and the court was closed for the day. The actual surrender took place at the McLean House. The National Park Service states that the Old Appomattox Court House is of paramount importance by virtue of its association with the site. It is vital under certain criteria of the National Park Service and by virtue of its creation of the Appomattox Court House National Historical Park by federal law. It represents the participation of the federal government in the preservation and commemoration of historically significant events related to the conclusion of the American Civil War.

Description
The reconstructed Old Appomattox Court House is a two-story structure of running bond brick with a raised second floor main entry. There is a second story east and west entry porch. The building has newel posts and balusters. The four-panel entry doors on the main level are flanked by 12/12 double hanging sash windows. It has three bays with a hipped flat-seam roof with wood trusses.

The rebuilt edifice has a brick paved first floor beneath the second floor hipped-roof porch with brick cast stone steps and cast iron railings. The lower level has a similar layout with a smaller four-panel door flanked by 8/8 double hanging sash windows. The end elevations have two internal chimneys flanked by 8/8 double hanging sash windows on the first floor with three 8/8 double hanging sash windows on the second level. There is a third sash window located in the center. All the windows of the "court house" have shutters.

Footnotes

Sources

Further reading
 
 
 
 
 

Appomattox Court House National Historical Park
Historic district contributing properties in Virginia
National Register of Historic Places in Appomattox County, Virginia
1846 establishments in Virginia

de:Appomattox Court House
es:Appomattox Court House
it:Appomattox Court House
ja:アポマトックス・コートハウス
pl:Appomattox Court House